Luigi Malice (born 1937, Naples, Italy) is an Italian abstract artist.

Malice studied at Naples Academy of Fine Arts as a pupil of Emilio Notte,  later studying under avant-garde and Informal Art painter Domenico Spinosa.
 
He began as an expressionist and figurative painter in the late 1950s, his then style demonstrated by his painting "Still life with figure" for which he received the Michetti Prize, and "Ricordo di Spagna" ("Memory of Spain") which Malice exhibited for the Posillipo Prize.

In the early 60's, he approached the Arte Informale, an Italian art movement close to the American Abstract expressionism and to the French Art Informel or Tachisme.

In 1963, Malice became a teacher in Reggio Calabria, where he exhibited in collective and one-man shows, and in 1967 exhibited at the Flaccovio Gallery in Palermo and the Santo Stefano Gallery in Venice.

After 1968, he concentrated on sculpture, and works consisting of waterproof cloth ("tela ciriè") on twisted plywood, imitating shaped canvases, these related to the work of his contemporaries Enrico Castellani, Agostino Bonalumi, and Pino Pascali, but also to wooden silhouettes of men of Mario Ceroli, and in the early 1970s constructed works with ready-made Plexiglas panels.<ref>Di Genova, Giorgio. "STORIA DELL'ARTE ITALIANA DEL '900. Generazione anni trenta, Bologna: Edizioni BORA, 2000, pp.41,116-117.</ref>

Malice exhibited in 1968 at the New York Coliseum, and in 1984, held a retrospective exhibition in Milan. Subsequently, his art took on abstract impressionism and lyrism of the colours.  The same year he became the principal of the Academy of Fine Arts, Reggio, Calabria. Malice exhibited at the Institute Francais "Le Grenoble" in Naples, and in a travelling exhibition that included Venice and Florence. In 1992, he presented a one-man show, "Percorsi 1965–1992" ("Itineraries 1965–1992"), at the Royal Palace, Naples. Since 2001, his work "Metamorphosis 1979" has been held in the Museo delle generazioni italiane, Pieve di Cento.
Recently the artist has exhibitedhis work at the Italian pavilion of the 54th Venice Biennale.

References

Further reading
 Enciclopedia Universale della Pittura moderna, Milano: S.E.D.A., 1969
 Arte Italiana Contemporanea, Firenze: Ediz. La Ginestra, 1972
 Barbera, Lucio. Luigi Malice: percorsi della memoria 1959–1999, Roma: Gangemi Editore, 1999,  (Italian/English) 
 Di Genova, Giorgio. MAGI '900 "G.BARGELLINI" PIEVE DI CENTO". Catalogo delle collezioni permanenti 3. Generazione anni trenta'', Bologna: Edizioni BORA, 2001, 
 Sgarbi, Vittorio. "54a Biennale di Venezia. Padiglione Italia. Lo Stato dell’Arte: Regioni d’Italia", Milano: Skira, 2012,

External links
Luigi Malice web site biography

Italian contemporary artists
Art Informel and Tachisme painters
20th-century Italian painters
Italian male painters
20th-century Italian sculptors
20th-century Italian male artists
Italian male sculptors
21st-century Italian sculptors
1937 births
Living people
21st-century Italian male artists